John Chambers (20 January 1819–11 July 1893) was a New Zealand pastoralist, community leader and businessman. He was born in Heanor, Derbyshire, England on 20 January 1819.

References

1819 births
1893 deaths
New Zealand businesspeople
English emigrants to New Zealand
New Zealand farmers